Jim Watt MBE (born 18 July 1948) is a Scottish former boxer and commentator who became world champion in the lightweight division when Roberto Durán left the title vacant in 1979 and the WBC had him fight Alfredo Pitalua. Watt knocked out Pitalua in twelve rounds.

Boxing career
Raised in the Bridgeton and Possilpark neighbourhoods of Glasgow, Watt trained at Cardowan Amateur Boxing Club in the city's Maryhill district. His father died when Jim was five years old. He came to prominence in 1968 by beating John H. Stracey to the ABA Championships; he turned professional immediately afterwards, declining the chance to compete as an amateur at the 1968 Summer Olympic Games in Mexico City.

Watt beat such notables as future world champion Sean O'Grady, former world champion Perico Fernandez, Charlie Nash and Howard Davis Jr. The fight with O'Grady was particularly controversial: Watt won by a knockout in round twelve when the referee stopped the fight because of a cut suffered by O'Grady. According to the book, The Ring: Boxing The 20th Century, the cut was produced by a head-butt, in which case the judges' scorecards would have been checked, and whoever was ahead given the win by a technical decision. The referee, however, declared that O' Grady's cut had been produced by a punch and Watt officially won the fight by knockout. 

Watt had also fought, and lost to, Ken Buchanan after 15 rounds in 1973. On 20 June 1981, he fought his last fight, when losing the WBC world Lightweight title to Alexis Argüello by a 15-round decision in London. The three judges' scores were 147–143, 147–143 and 147–137.  Watt retired with a record of 38 wins (27 by knockout) and 8 losses (3 by knockout).

After boxing 
Watt was appointed Member of the Order of the British Empire (MBE) in the 1980 Birthday Honours for services to boxing. He was long-term co-commentator with Reg Gutteridge on ITV's The Big Fight Live and moved with Gutteridge to Sky Sports in 1996 when ITV withdrew from boxing coverage. During 2016, Watt announced his retirement as a boxing commentator.

Watt made a special guest appearance on the BBC's Still Game sitcom in August 2007, as well as television adverts for Kelvin Timber (a Scottish home and building supplies stores company) in the 1980s. He and his family settled in the town of Kirkintilloch to the north of Glasgow.

Personal life
In June 2015, Watt's 38-year-old daughter Michelle Watt took her own life after suffering chronic headaches caused by a spinal operation. She appeared in various programmes as a television hostess, including 60 Minute Makeover. Watt's 17-year-old son James died in a car crash in 1995.

Professional boxing record

See also 
 List of British lightweight boxing champions
 List of lightweight boxing champions
 List of WBC world champions

References

External links 
 

|-

1948 births
Scottish sports broadcasters
Lightweight boxers
Living people
Boxers from Glasgow
People from Bridgeton, Glasgow
Sportspeople from Kirkintilloch
Scottish male boxers
Sports commentators
World Boxing Council champions
People from Possilpark
Members of the Order of the British Empire